was a town located in Tagata District, Shizuoka Prefecture, Japan.

As of March 1, 2004, final population data before the amalgamation, the town had an estimated population of 7,677 and a density of 56.8 persons per km2. The total area was 135.14 km2.

On April 1, 2004, Amagiyugashima, along with the towns of Nakaizu, Shuzenji and Toi (all from Tagata District), was merged to create the city of Izu.

Amagiyugashima was noted for its production of wasabi. It was also the location of the Amagi Tunnel, a tourist attraction based on a famous scene in Yasunari Kawabata's novel The Dancing Girl of Izu.

External links
Izu City official website (Japanese)

Dissolved municipalities of Shizuoka Prefecture
Izu, Shizuoka